In mathematics, chromatic homotopy theory is a subfield of stable homotopy theory that studies complex-oriented cohomology theories from the "chromatic" point of view, which is based on Quillen's work relating cohomology theories to formal groups. In this picture, theories are classified in terms of their "chromatic levels"; i.e., the heights of the formal groups that define the theories via the Landweber exact functor theorem. Typical theories it studies include: complex K-theory, elliptic cohomology, Morava K-theory and tmf.

Chromatic convergence theorem 
In algebraic topology, the chromatic convergence theorem states the homotopy limit of the chromatic tower (defined below) of a finite p-local spectrum  is  itself. The theorem was proved by Hopkins and Ravenel.

Statement 
Let  denotes the Bousfield localization with respect to the Morava E-theory and let  be a finite, -local spectrum.  Then there is a tower associated to the localizations 

called the chromatic tower, such that its homotopy limit is homotopic to the original spectrum .

The stages in the tower above are often simplifications of the original spectrum.

Stable homotopy groups 
In particular, if the -local spectrum  is the stable -local sphere spectrum , then the homotopy limit of this sequence is the original -local sphere spectrum. This is a key observation for studying stable homotopy groups of spheres using chromatic homotopy theory.

See also 
Elliptic cohomology
Redshift conjecture
Ravenel conjectures
Moduli stack of formal group laws
Chromatic spectral sequence
Adams-Novikov spectral sequence

References

External links 
http://ncatlab.org/nlab/show/chromatic+homotopy+theory

Homotopy theory
Cohomology theories